The Klemm Kl 32 was a touring aircraft, developed in Germany in 1932, based on the Klemm Kl 31 as a competitor in the Challenge 1932 touring aircraft competition.

Design and development
Like its predecessor, the KI 32 was a conventional, low-wing cantilever monoplane with fixed, tailskid undercarriage. The Kl 32, however, had a smaller cabin (seating three), and a fuselage built from wood rather than metal.

Eight Kl 32s were entered in the competition, seven by German teams and one by a Swiss team. These were powered by a variety of engines, including the Bramo Sh 14, Argus As 8, de Havilland Gipsy, and Hirth HM 150. Notable German pilots included Robert Lusser (who designed the aircraft), Wolf Hirth, and Reinhold Poss.

Hirth won the short takeoff trial in his Kl 32, and Poss tied for second place in the overall competition with his. Five of the teams flying Kl 32s finished in the top ten in the "rally over Europe" part of the competition, and five of the top ten scores overall were achieved by teams flying Kl 32s.

A Klemm L32-V (VH-UVE, originally D-2299) was flown by Maude Bonney during her Brisbane to Cape Town flight in 1937, a distance of 29,088 km and the first flight from Australia to South Africa.

Specifications

See also

References

 
 
 

Klemm aircraft
1930s German sport aircraft
Low-wing aircraft
Single-engined tractor aircraft
Aircraft first flown in 1932